Caucasian Review of International Affairs was a quarterly peer-reviewed online academic journal covering the countries of the Caucasus and the issues of contemporary international relations. It was established in 2006 as the Caucasian Journal of European Affairs, discontinued in 2010.

The journal published research papers, comments, book reviews, and interviews, as well as a weekly analytical piece, the Caucasus Update.

Abstracting and Indexing 
The journal was abstracted and indexed in Columbia International Affairs Online, ProQuest, EBSCOhost, International Relations and Security Network, World Affairs Online, Virtuelle Fachbibliothek Osteuropa, Global Development Network, and Social Sciences Eastern Europe.

References

External links 
 

Caucasus
International relations journals
Open access journals
Area studies journals
Quarterly journals
English-language journals